Kate Williams (born December 1941) is an English actress best known for playing Joan Booth in  Love Thy Neighbour (1972–1976) and Liz Turner in EastEnders (2006–2010).

She has also played Dorothy Burgess in May to December (1989–1994), Myra Costello in Family Affairs (2003–2005) and Aunty Vera in Birds of a Feather (2015–2016) as well as roles in the films Holiday on the Buses (1973) and Quadrophenia (1979).

Career 
Williams is known for three television roles: Joan Booth in the 1970s sitcom Love Thy Neighbour; Teresa in the 1971 BBC play Edna, the Inebriate Woman; and Audrey Withey in the crime drama Widows. She reprised the role of Audrey in both Widows 2 (1985), and 1995 sequel She's Out. In addition to her appearance in Holiday on the Buses, in which she played the Holiday Camp nurse, she had previously appeared as Wendy, a brassy conductress, in the fourth episode of the fourth series of On the Buses, the episode entitled  "The Other Woman"', and in an earlier episode titled "Late Again"' as a different character.

Williams starred in the film version of Love Thy Neighbour (1973), and played Mrs Perkins in the film Melody (1971). Her other film credits include: Poor Cow (1967), Till Death Us Do Part (1969), Holiday on the Buses (1973), What's Up Nurse! (1977), Quadrophenia (1979), Party Party (1983) and Little Dorrit (1987).

Her guest roles on TV include: Dixon of Dock Green, On the Buses, Please Sir!, Minder, The Gentle Touch, Just Good Friends, C.A.T.S. Eyes, Only Fools and Horses, May to December, Murder Most Horrid, Lovejoy, Doctor At Large, Born and Bred, The Bill and  Unforgotten.

Williams also appeared in the BBC soap opera EastEnders, playing Liz Turner. Williams returned as a regular character in 2009, but in 2010, it was announced that the character of Liz Turner was to be dropped. Williams was last seen in the role in August 2010. 

In January 2016, Williams played the role of Sharon and Tracey's 'Auntie' Vera on Birds of a Feather, a role which she went on to reprise in later episodes. In November 2019, she appeared in an episode of the BBC soap opera Doctors as Peggy Sampson.

In 2021 Williams appeared in the series Unforgotten.

Filmography

Film

Television

References

External links

1941 births
Living people
English soap opera actresses
Actresses from London
English film actresses